Mokvi is a river in the Ochamchira District of Abkhazia, Georgia. The river's length is about 47 km and watershed — 336 km2. It forms on southern slopes of Kodori Range, at 2560 meters above sea level. River mouth with the Black Sea is near village Jukmuri. Mokvi river feeds by snow, rain and groundwater.

References 

Rivers of Georgia (country)
Rivers of Abkhazia
Tributaries of the Black Sea